Runglawan Thonahongsa is a Thai movie and TV drama actress.
She was born on 30 May 1979 in Nakhon Ratchasima (Khorat), She is a Faculty of Arts graduate from Suan Dusit University.

Career
Runglawan became famous throughout Thailand when she impersonated Nu Hin (หนูหิ่น), meaning Rock Rat, a figure of popular Thai comics which was brought to the screen in the 2006 Thai film "Nu Hin: The Movie" (หนูหิ่น เดอะ มูฟวี่). Runglawan received the Thailand National Film Association Award for her role in the movie, as well as two Bangkok Critics Association Awards.

Created in the early 1990s by Thai cartoonist Padung Kraisri, Nu Hin was a character previously well known by Thai audiences: a young and cheeky girl wearing a bob cut, dressed in the traditional daily outfit of rural Isan and speaking in the language of local females from lower-class background. Her witty and down-to-earth ways and happy-go-lucky attitude easily lead to comical situations whenever and wherever she interacts with more sophisticated people while working as a housemaid in Bangkok. Well-loved by audiences, Runglawan Thonahongsa is regularly involved in charity work.

Thai TV soap operas
 Ying Rak Toe, ยิ่งรักเธอ (2004) Channel 3
 Koo Ruk Plick Lock, คู่รักพลิกล็อค (2004) Channel 3, RS
 Khleun Rak Si Khram, คลื่นรักสีคราม (2005) Channel 5, Exact Co.
 7 Mahatsachan, 7 มหัศจรรย์  (2006) Channel 7, Kantana Group
 Phleng Rak Rim Fan Khong, เพลงรักริมฝั่งโขง (2007) Channel 7 คำพอดี
 Klin Kaeo Klang Chai, กลิ่นแก้วกลางใจ (2007) Channel 3
 Siang Luang Siang Rak, เสี่ยงลวงเสี่ยงรัก (2008) Channel 7 Kantana Group
 Re Rai Luk Sao Pa, เรไรลูกสาวป่า (2008) Channel 7 คำพอดี
 Montra Haeng Rak, มนตราแห่งรัก (2008) Channel 7 Kantana Group
 Ban Ni Mi Rak, บ้านนี้มีรัก; “There is love in this house” (guest star 2008) Channel 9 Exact Co.
 Sap Pu Sa, สาปภูษา (2009) Channel 3
 Nat Kap Nat, นัดกับนัด (guest star 2009) Channel 9 Exact Co.
 Suai Saep Sing, สวย แสบ ซิ่ง (2009) Channel 7 DaraVDO
 Thepphabut Maya Thepthida Cham Laeng, เทพบุตรมายา เทพธิดาจำแลง (2010) Channel 7 Kantana Group
 Phu Kong Chao Sane, ผู้กองเจ้าเสน่ห์ (guest star 2011-2012) Channel 3 Scenario
 Chao Ying Long Yuk, เจ้าหญิงหลงยุค (2011) Channel 7 Mirabilis
 Rak Yu Hon Dai, รักอยู่หนใด (2011) Channel 7 Mirabilis
 Mue Prap Maha Hian, มือปราบมหาเฮี้ยน (2011) Channel 7 มงคลการละคร
 Phut Sao Chai Sane, ภูตสาวเจ้าเสน่ห์ (2012) Channel 3 ดีวัน ทีวี
 Pin Anong ปิ่นอนงค์ (2012) Channel 7 มุมใหม่
 Nen Cha, เณรจ๋า (2013) Channel 7 Zense Entertainment
 Yai Bun Kap Mothuem, ยัยบุญ กับ หมอทึ่ม (2013) Channel 3 BEC-TERO Entertainment, จันทร์ 25
 Khu Rak Phlik Lok, คู่รักพลิกล็อก (2013) Channel 7
 Dom Thong, โดมทอง (2013) Channel 7 ดีด้า วิดีโอ โปรดักชั่น
 Thon โทน (2013) Channel 7 นพพร โปรโมชั่น
 Wiman Maphrao, วิมานมะพร้าว (2013) Channel 7 Phodikham
 7 Mongkut, 7 มงกุฎ (2014) Channel 7 มาสเตอร์พีซ เอ็นเทอร์เทนเม้นต์
 Chao Sao Sala Tan, เจ้าสาวสลาตัน (2014) Channel 7 Kantana Group
 Khun Na Chai Rak Re คุณชายรักเร่ (2014) Channel 3 BEC-TERO Entertainment, จันทร์ 25
 Susan Khon Pen, สุสานคนเป็น (2014) Channel 7 Kantana Group
 Phrao, พราว (2014) Channel 7 Phodikham (guest star)
 Lan Sao Niranam, หลานสาวนิรนาม (2014) Channel 7 59 ออนแอร์
 Saphai Sai Lap, สะใภ้สายลับ (2015) Channel 3 ควิซ แอนด์ เควส
 Like Mat Sang, ลิเกหมัดสั่ง (2015) Channel 8 มั่งมีศรีสุขโปรดักชั่น
 Rak Re รักเร่ (2015) Channel 7 ฮันนี่ แอนด์ เฟรนด์ เอ็นเทอร์เทนเม้นท
 Thayat Asun ทายาทอสูร (2015) Channel 3 D One TV
 Chan Thana Sam Cha, ฉันทนาสามช่า (2015) Channel 7 Phodikham
 Chao Sao Chaphokit, เจ้าสาวเฉพาะกิจ (2015) Channel 8
 See Mai Karn (2019), สี่ไม้คาน (2019) Channel 7 Mongkol Kan Lakorn
 You Are My Heartbeat (2022), จังหวะหัวใจนายสะอาด (2022) PPTV Act9
 Phuea Mae Phae Bo Dai (2023), เพื่อแม่แพ้บ่ได้ (2023) One 31
 Sapai Sai Strong (2023), สะใภ้สายสตรอง (2023) Ch.3
 Luerd Chao Phraya (2023) , เลือดเจ้าพระยา (2023) Ch.3 Arlong Group

Movies

See also
Thai comics

References

External links
 
 IMDb Noo Hin: The Movie (2006)
 Noo-Hin: The Movie (THAI 2006) - Trailer
ตอนใหม่ New หนูหิ่นเดอะซีรีย์ 2015 EP.01 ตอน เรื่องม่วนๆของหนูหิ่น ที่โนนหินแห่

 

1979 births
Living people
Runglawan Thonahongsa
Runglawan Thonahongsa